Rudy Reyes (born February 27, 1977) is an American teacher, actor, archaeologist, cannabis rights activist, and chef. Reyes was a contestant in the reality television competition, MasterChef, on the show's fourth season.

Californian Reyes, known for his bravery during the Cedar Fire of 2003, volunteers as a mentor for young burn survivors, and spokesperson for United Way and the Burn Institute.

Cedar Fire survivor 
Heroism during 2003 wildfire

A resident of San Diego County, California, Reyes became known for his role in the Cedar Fire of 2003. During the fire, he helped others get to safety first, before he was trapped by the fire. Reyes soaked himself in the shower, and ran more than a mile through the fire. He sustained burns over approximately 70 percent of his body, and lost one ear and part of a finger.

Reyes has had numerous surgeries and uses cannabis salve to aid healing of his skin. According to Reyes, vaporized marijuana was more effective than other drugs prescribed for pain while he was hospitalized.

Early activism 
After the Witch Creek wildfire burned San Diego County again four years later in 2007, Reyes became critical of his representative on the San Diego County Board of Supervisors, Dianne Jacob, for her vote to spend the county's resources to file a lawsuit against California's medical marijuana law, Proposition 215, which was passed by voters in 1996, rather than using the public's money to build a hospital and for fire prevention.

Reyes ran against Jacob and lost, but Reyes received more than 20,000 votes, about 22 percent, in the June 3, 2008, election.

2010s career

How Weed Won the West film appearance 
While making the cannabis documentary How Weed Won the West, in 2010, Reyes worked with producer and director Kevin Booth, and was featured portraying himself in the film.

2010—2012 candidacies 
Reyes ran for Santee, California, City Council in 2010, San Diego County Board of Supervisors in 2012, and for Santee Mayor, against 12-year incumbent Randy Voepel, in 2012.

Quail Brush power plant critic 
In 2012, archeologist Reyes testified against the Quail Brush power plant proposed in San Diego, near Santee, which was opposed by the Santee City Council.

2013 MasterChef contestant 
Reyes appeared as a contestant in the reality television competition, MasterChef, on the premiere episode of the show's fourth season.

2016 San Diego County Board of Supervisors candidate 
Reyes ran for San Diego County Board of Supervisors, District 2, in 2016 and lost. The only Democratic candidate to face Republican incumbent Jacob, Reyes campaigned for increased fire protections and to make medical marijuana more accessible. In the June 7 primary, Reyes received more than 38,000 votes, almost 27 percent.

2018 Santee City Council candidate 
In 2018, Reyes ran unsuccessfully for District 2 Santee City Council. He was endorsed by the San Diego Democratic Party. Reyes received 1,510 votes, more than 31 percent, in the November 6 general election.

2020s activism

Vice-presidential campaign 
Reyes was nominated by the Legal Marijuana Now Party, in 2020, to run for Vice-president of the United States. But due to 2020 Iowa COVID-19 petitioning obstacles, the campaign was postponed until 2024.

Personal life 
Early life and education

Rudy Reyes, who belongs to the Barona Band of Mission Indians, graduated from El Capitan High School in Lakeside, California. He holds degrees in archeology and anthropology from San Diego State University, and a degree from California Western School of Law.

Political candidacy 
Rudy Reyes has run for public office several times, including:
 San Diego County Board of Supervisors in 2008, 2012, and 2016
 Santee, California, City Council in 2008, 2010, and 2018
 Santee Mayor, in 2012

Television and film 
Rudy Reyes, who had a role as himself in the 2010 documentary film How Weed Won the West, was a contestant in the television competition, MasterChef, on the first episode in Season 4 of the American reality show, in 2013.

References

External links
Ballotpedia: Rudy Reyes
April 8, 2006, Medical marijuana patient Rudy Reyes attends the 4th National Clinical Conference on Cannabis Therapeutics April 8, 2006, in Santa Barbara, California Getty Images
February 23, 2021, Cannabis Industry/Advocates/Lobbyists: Rudy Reyes (Cedar Wildfire Survivor, Former Board of Supervisors Candidate), San Diego County
February 21, 2009, Medical Marijuana (Rudy Reyes) San Diego YouTube
Documentary: "RxCannabis" (September 16, 2012) Rudy Reyes, Medical Cannabis patient YouTube
May 20, 2013, Rudy Reyes' Inspiring Story (MasterChef Season 4 Episode 1) YouTube

1977 births
Living people
American amputees
American cannabis activists
American film actors
Burn survivors
Politicians from San Diego
Candidates in the 2020 United States presidential election
Chefs from California
Contestants on American game shows
Hispanic and Latino American candidates for President of the United States
Hispanic and Latino American people in California politics
Hispanic and Latino American teachers
Native American anthropologists
San Diego State University alumni
Schoolteachers from California